Musser is a surname.

Musser may also refer to:
Musser Mallet Company, manufacturer of xylophones, marimbas, and vibraphones, now part of Ludwig Drums
Musser-Stevens grip, a method of playing keyboard percussion instruments with four mallets
Musser Scout Reservation
Musser Lumber Company

See also

Moussier (disambiguation)
Musse
MUSS (disambiguation)